I Believe to My Soul is an album by jazz pianist Junior Mance which was released on the Atlantic label in 1968.

Reception

Allmusic awarded the album 3 stars with the review by Dave Nathan stating, "Mance never ventures far from that jazzy soulfulness which characterized his playing. This is a good representative recording by an artist who was never able to raise himself to the top tier of jazz pianists".

Track listing
All compositions by Junior Mance except where indicated
 "I Believe to My Soul" (Ray Charles) – 5:11
 "A Time and a Place" (Jimmy Heath) – 5:07
 "Sweet Georgia Brown" (Ben Bernie, Maceo Pinkard, Kenneth Casey) – 3:13
 "Golden Spur" – 5:06
 "Don't Worry 'Bout It" – 2:08
 "Home on the Range" (Traditional) – 6:47 
 "Sweets for My Sweet" (Doc Pomus, Mort Shuman) – 5:41
 "My Romance" (Richard Rodgers, Lorenz Hart) – 3:51

Personnel
Junior Mance – piano 
Melvin Lastie (track 5), Joe Newman (tracks 1, 5 & 7), Jimmy Owens (tracks 1 & 7) – trumpet
David Newman (tracks 1, 5 & 7), Frank Wess (track 5) – tenor saxophone
Hubert Laws – tenor saxophone, flute (tracks 1 & 7)
Bobby Capers (tracks 1 & 7), Haywood Henry (track 5) – baritone saxophone 
Bob Cunningham (tracks 3 & 4), Richard Davis (tracks 2, 5, 6 & 8) – bass
Jimmy Tyrell – electric bass (tracks 1 & 7)
Alan Dawson (tracks 3 & 4), Ray Lucas (tracks 1 & 7), Freddie Waits (tracks 2, 5, 6 & 8) – drums
Ray Barretto – congas (track 7)
Sylvia Shemwell – vocals (tracks 1 & 7) 
Uunidentified string section conducted by Gene Orloff (track 6)

References

 

1968 albums
Junior Mance albums
Atlantic Records albums
Albums produced by Joel Dorn